Little Feat is the debut studio album by American rock band Little Feat, released in 1971 by Warner Bros. Records.

The album was recorded mostly in sessions between August and September 1970. Its sound is in a similar vein as the band's more widely known later recordings, such as 1973's Dixie Chicken and 1978's Waiting For Columbus. The record features Little Feat's initial line-up, with Roy Estrada on bass. It was the first of eight albums by the band before its first break up in 1979. The cover shows the mural Venice in the Snow, painted by the L. A. Fine Arts Squad in 1970, in Venice, Los Angeles. In 2007 the album was released as a gold CD through the Mobile Fidelity Sound Lab.

Track listing

Personnel 
Source:
Little Feat
Lowell George – lead, rhythm and slide guitars, lead vocals (all songs except where noted) and backing vocals, harmonica
Bill Payne – keyboards, lead ("Snakes on Everything" and "Takin' My Time") and backing vocals, piano
Roy Estrada – bass, backing vocals
Richard Hayward – drums, backing vocals

Additional
Russ Titelman – percussion, backing vocals, piano on "I've Been The One"
Ry Cooder – bottleneck guitar on "Willin'" and "Forty Four Blues / How Many More Years"
Sneaky Pete Kleinow – pedal steel on "I've Been The One"
Kirby Johnson – string and horn arrangements

References

External links
 Mobile Fidelity Sound Lab Ultradisc II 24 KT Gold CD

1971 debut albums
Little Feat albums
Albums produced by Russ Titelman
Warner Records albums
Albums recorded at United Western Recorders
Albums recorded at Record Plant (Los Angeles)